Lake Texcoco was a natural lake within the Anahuac or Valley of Mexico. Lake Texcoco is best known for an island situated on the western side of the lake where the Mexica built the city of Mēxihco Tenōchtitlan, would later become the capital of the Aztec Empire. After the Spanish conquest, efforts to control flooding led to most of the lake being drained. 

The entire lake basin is now almost completely occupied by Mexico City, the capital of the present-day nation of Mexico. Drainage of the lake has led to serious ecological and human consequences: the local climate and water availability have changed considerably, contributing to water scarcity in the area; subsequent groundwater extraction leads to land subsidence under much of the city; and native species endemic to the lake region have become severely endangered or extinct due to ecosystem change, such as the axolotl. 

After the cancellation of the Mexico City Texcoco Airport, the government initiated a major restoration project of a significant part of the lake in the form of the Lake Texcoco Ecological Park, 12,000 hectares of public space and ecological restoration.

Geography
Lake Texcoco formerly extended over a large portion of the southern half of the basin, where it was the largest of an interconnected chain of five major and several smaller lakes (the other main lakes being Lakes Xaltocan, Zumpango, Chalco, and Xochimilco). Much of the lake was fed from groundwater aquifers; fresh water poured in from Lake Chalco and Xochimilco's freshwater springs, and the thermal springs of Zumpango and Xaltocan, as well as some in Texcoco itself, provided saline water. In the drier winter months the lake system tended to separate into individual bodies of water, a flow that was mitigated by the construction of dikes and causeways in the Late Postclassic period of Mesoamerican chronology. Lake Texcoco was the lowest-lying of all the lakes, and occupied the minimum elevation in the valley so that water ultimately drained towards it. The Valley of Mexico is a closed or endorheic basin. Because there is no outflow, evapotranspiration is estimated to be 72–79% of precipitation.

History
Between the Pleistocene epoch and the last glacial period, the lake occupied the entire Mexico Valley. When the lake's water level fell it created several paleo-lakes that would connect with each other from time to time. At the north in the modern community of San Miguel Tocuilla there is a great paleontological field, with a great amount of pleistocenic fauna. The Lake was primarily fed by snowmelt and rain runoff when the Mexico Valley had a temperate climate. Between 11,000 and 6,000 years ago, the climate naturally warmed and snowfall in central Mexico became less prevalent. This caused the water level of the lake to drop over the next several millennia. Remnants of the ancient shoreline that Lake Texcoco had from the last glacial period can be seen on some slopes of Mount Tlaloc as well as mountains west of Mexico City. The disarticulated remains of seven Columbian mammoths dated between 10,220 ± 75 and 12,615 ± 95 years (BP) were found, suggesting human presence. It is believed that the lake disappeared and re-formed at least 10 times in the last 30,000 years.

Agriculture around the lake began about 7,000 years ago, with humans following the patterns of periodic inundations of the lake.

Several villages appeared on the northeast side of the lake between 1700 and 1250 BC. By 1250 BC the identifying signs of the Tlatilco culture, including more complex settlements and a stratified social structure, are seen around the lake. By roughly 800 BC Cuicuilco had eclipsed the Tlatilco cultural centers and was the major power in the Valley of Mexico during the next 200 years when its famous conical pyramid was built. The Xitle volcano destroyed Cuicuilco around AD 30, a destruction that may have given rise to Teotihuacan.

After the fall of Teotihuacan, AD 600–800, several other city states appeared around the lake, including Xoloc, Azcapotzalco, Tlacopan, Coyohuacan, Culhuacán, Chimalpa, and Chimalhuacán – mainly from Toltec and Chichimeca influence. None of these predominated and they coexisted more or less in peace for several centuries. This time was described as a Golden age in Aztec chronicles. By the year 1300, however, the Tepanec from Azcapotzalco were beginning to dominate the area.

Tenochtitlan 

According to a traditional story, the Mexica wandered in the deserts of modern Mexico for 100 years before they came to the thick forests of the place now called the Valley of Mexico.

Tenochtitlan was founded on an islet in the western part of the lake in the year 1325. Around it, the Aztecs created a large artificial island using a system similar to the creation of chinampas. To overcome the problems of drinking water, the Aztecs built a system of dams to separate the salty waters of the lake from the rain water of the effluents. It also permitted them to control the level of the lake. The city also had an inner system of channels that helped to control the water.

The Aztec ruler Ahuitzotl attempted to build an aqueduct that would take fresh water from the mainland to the lakes surrounding the Tenochtitlan city. The aqueduct failed, and the city suffered a major flood in 1502.

During Hernán Cortés's siege of Tenochtitlan in 1521, the dams were destroyed, and never rebuilt, so flooding became a big problem for the new Mexico City built over Tenochtitlan.

Artificial drainage 

Mexico City suffered from periodic floods; in 1604 the lake flooded the city, with an even more severe flood following in 1607. Under the direction of Enrico Martínez, a drain was built to control the level of the lake, but in 1629 another flood kept most of the city covered for five years. At that time, it was debated whether to relocate the city, but the Spanish authorities decided to keep the existing location.

Eventually the lake was drained by the channels and a tunnel to the Pánuco River, but even that could not stop floods, since by then most of the city was under the water table. The flooding could not be completely controlled until the twentieth century. The eastern discharge tunnel was inaugurated in 2019.

The ecological consequences of the draining were enormous. Parts of the valleys were turned semi-arid, and even today Mexico City suffers from lack of water. Due to overdrafting that is depleting the aquifer beneath the city, Mexico City is estimated to have sunk 10 meters (33 feet) in the last century. Furthermore, because soft lake sediments underlie most of Mexico City, the city has proven vulnerable to soil liquefaction during earthquakes, most notably in the 1985 earthquake when hundreds of buildings collapsed and thousands of people died.

Also there are small remnants of the lakes of Xochimilco, Chalco, and Zumpango.

Several species indigenous to the lake are now extinct or endangered (e.g. axolotls).

The modern Texcoco Lake has a high concentration of salts and its waters are evaporated for their processing. A Mexican company, "Sosa Texcoco S.A." has an  solar evaporator known as El Caracol.

Land reclamation of the lakebed was part of Mexico's attempts at development in the twentieth century.

Restoration and conservation

Ecological park

See also
 History of Mexico City
 Index of Mexico-related articles
 Paleontological Museum in Tocuila
 List of prehistoric lakes

Notes

References

External links
 Agua y Subordinación en la Cuenca del Río Lerma 

Lakes of Mexico
Former lakes of North America
Valley of Mexico
Geography of Mesoamerica
Landforms of Mexico City
Landforms of the State of Mexico
Pánuco River
Tenochtitlan
Tlatilco culture
Important Bird Areas of Mexico
Ramsar sites in Mexico